The Price She Paid is a 1924 American silent drama film directed by Henry MacRae and starring Alma Rubens, Frank Mayo and Eugenie Besserer.

Cast
 Alma Rubens as Mildred Gower 
 Frank Mayo as Dr. Donald Keith 
 Eugenie Besserer as Mrs. Elton Gower 
 William Welsh as General Lemuel Sidall 
 Lloyd Whitlock as Jack Prescott 
 Otto Hoffman as Seth Kehr 
 Edwards Davis as Attorney Ellison 
 Wilfred Lucas as James Presbury 
 Ed Brady as Deputy Sheriff 
 Freeman Wood as Stanley Baird

References

Bibliography
 Bernard F. Dick. Columbia Pictures: Portrait of a Studio. University Press of Kentucky, 2015.

External links
 

1924 films
1924 drama films
1920s English-language films
American silent feature films
Silent American drama films
American black-and-white films
Films directed by Henry MacRae
Columbia Pictures films
1920s American films